La Vie d'artiste is a French film written and directed in 2006 by Marc Fitoussi, realised in 2007.

Plot 
Alice dreams of being a film or stage actress, but is now reduced to dubbing the voice of Yoko Johnson, a Japanese cartoon detective character. Bertrand is writing his second novel and aspires to literary greatness. Meanwhile, he teaches French in a secondary school. Cora hopes to break into the French songwriting world, but has to work as hostess in a karaoke bar. All three are determined to achieve their goals and it is too bad if the paths to glory are strewn with pitfalls.

Cast 
 Sandrine Kiberlain : Alice, actress reduced to dubbing manga
 Émilie Dequenne : Cora, aspiring singer reduced to odd jobs
 Denis Podalydès : Bertrand, French teacher and unsuccessful writer
 Valérie Benguigui : Solange, Betrand's partner, maths teacher colleague
 Marilyne Canto : Alice's sister
 Camille Japy : Annabella, actress friend of Alice, successful in theatre
 Grégoire Leprince-Ringuet :Frédéric, Bertrand's wise pupil
 Magali Woch : Manu, Cora's best friend
 Claire Maurier : Alice's agent, in whom she has no faith
 Aure Atika : manager of the Hippopotamus restaurant who employs Cora
 Jean-Pierre Kalfon : Joseph Costals, singer-songwriter admired by Cora
 Maria Schneider : wife of Joseph Costals
 Jean-Marie Winling : Bertrand's editor
 Éric Savin : Michel, who dubs the manga with Alice
 Stéphane Guillon : Michel's replacement, very talkative
 Solenn Jarniou : Bénédicte, who supervises the manga dubbing
 Francis Leplay : Alice's brother-in-law
 Thibault Vinçon : Cora's neighbour
 Lolita Chammah : Caroline
 Chantal Banlier : Annick
 Anne Bouvier : the bookseller
 Catherine Davenier : Mme directorr
 Titouan Laporte : Sacha, Alice' nephew
 Thomas Derichebourg : partner of Annabella
 Monique Couturier : the woman in the dressing room
 Olivier Claverie : casting director
 Véronique Barrault : casting director
 Éric Elmosnino : Alice's ex

Awards 
 Deauville American Film Festival 2007 - Prix Michel d’Ornano

References

External links 

 

2007 films
2007 directorial debut films
Films directed by Marc Fitoussi